WKSD (99.7 FM) is a radio station broadcasting a locally produced Classic Hits format.  Licensed to Paulding, Ohio, United States, the station is currently owned by First Family Broadcasting and features news programming from ABC Radio.

History
The station went on the air as WKSD on June 7, 1989.  On April 10, 1992, the station changed its call sign to WERT-FM, and on September 6, 1996, changed back to the original WKSD.

WKSD serves as a sister station to WERT (AM) 1220 kHz in neighboring Van Wert.

The original WERT-FM at 98.9 in Van Wert is now WBYR, now a Fort Wayne market station and no longer co-owned with WERT. That station has since changed its city of license to Woodburn, Indiana.

References

External links

KSD
Radio stations established in 1989